A Philosophical Enquiry into the Origin of Our Ideas of the Sublime and Beautiful is a 1757 treatise on aesthetics written by Edmund Burke. It was the first complete philosophical exposition for separating the beautiful and the sublime into their own respective rational categories. It attracted the attention of prominent thinkers such as Denis Diderot and Immanuel Kant.

Summary

According to Burke, the Beautiful is that which is well-formed and aesthetically pleasing, whereas the Sublime is that which has the power to compel and destroy us. The preference for the Sublime over the Beautiful was to mark the transition from the Neoclassical to the Romantic era.

The origins of our ideas of the beautiful and the sublime, for Burke, can be understood by means of their causal structures. According to Aristotelian physics and metaphysics, causation can be divided into formal, material, efficient and final causes. The formal cause of beauty is the passion of love; the material cause concerns aspects of certain objects such as smallness, smoothness, delicacy, etc.; the efficient cause is the calming of our nerves; the final cause is God's providence. What is most peculiar and original to Burke's view of beauty is that it cannot be understood by the traditional bases of beauty: proportion, fitness, or perfection. The sublime also has a causal structure that is unlike that of beauty. Its formal cause is thus the passion of fear (especially the fear of death); the material cause is equally aspects of certain objects such as vastness, infinity, magnificence, etc.; its efficient cause is the tension of our nerves; the final cause is God having created and battled Satan, as expressed in John Milton's great epic Paradise Lost.

Kant's comments
Immanuel Kant critiqued Burke for not understanding the causes of the mental effects that occur in the experience of the beautiful or the sublime. According to Kant, Burke merely gathered data so that some future thinker could explain them.

Notes

References
 Vermeir, Koen and Funk Deckard, Michael (eds.) The Science of Sensibility: Reading Burke's Philosophical Enquiry (International Archives of the History of Ideas, Vol. 206) (Springer, 2012)
 Doran, Robert. The Theory of the Sublime from Longinus to Kant. Cambridge:Cambridge University Press, 2015.

External links

 Complete text online

Aesthetics literature
Works by Edmund Burke
1757 works
Modern philosophical literature